Farara is a monotypic moth genus of the family Noctuidae. Its only species, Farara pulchra, is found on New Guinea. Both the genus and species were first described by George Thomas Bethune-Baker in 1908.

References

Acontiinae
Monotypic moth genera